Greatest Hits, Volume 2 is a compilation album by American country music artist Charley Pride. It was released in May 1985 via RCA Records. The album includes the singles "Down on the Farm" and "Let a Little Love Come In".

Track listing

Chart performance

References

1985 compilation albums
Charley Pride albums
Albums produced by Norro Wilson
RCA Records compilation albums